William James Palmer (19 April 1882 – 21 December 1967) was a British track and field athlete who competed in the 1908 Summer Olympics and in the 1912 Summer Olympics. He was born in Windsor, Berkshire.

In 1908 he finished sixth in the 10 mile walk event. He also participated in the final of the 3500 metre walk competition but did not finish the race.

Four years later he participated in the final of the 10 kilometre walk competition but did not finish the race again.

References

External links
profile
Bill Palmer. Sports Reference. Retrieved 2015-02-01.

1882 births
1967 deaths
Sportspeople from Windsor, Berkshire
British male racewalkers
English male racewalkers
Olympic athletes of Great Britain
Athletes (track and field) at the 1908 Summer Olympics
Athletes (track and field) at the 1912 Summer Olympics